Aviation Boulevard is a major north–south thoroughfare in western and the South Bay region of Los Angeles County, California.

Route Description
It runs for 7.1 miles (11.4 km), starting near Westchester, and through the beach cities of El Segundo, Manhattan Beach and Hermosa Beach, where its southern terminus is at Pacific Coast Highway. It lies adjacent to Los Angeles International Airport.

The northern end is a continuation of Florence Avenue at Manchester Avenue in Inglewood.

Transportation
Bus routes on Aviation Boulevard include  Santa Monica Transit lines 3 and Rapid 3, Culver City Transit lines 6 and Rapid 6, Beach Cities Transit line 109, and Torrance Transit line 8.  The Metro C Line operates a station under Interstate 105.

References

Streets in Los Angeles County, California
Streets in Los Angeles
Boulevards in the United States
El Segundo, California
Hawthorne, California
Hermosa Beach, California
Inglewood, California
Manhattan Beach, California
Westchester, Los Angeles